Matthew LaMont Mitchell (born December 16, 1970) is an American former college basketball coach, who was most recently head coach for University of Kentucky women's basketball. On November 12, 2020, Mitchell announced his retirement from coaching.

Coaching
Mitchell became the head coach of UK on April 23, 2007, succeeding former UK coach Mickie DeMoss. Prior to becoming the coach at Kentucky, Mitchell spent two years as the head coach at Morehead State. Mitchell started his coaching career as graduate assistant under Pat Summitt at Tennessee, and he also spent time as an assistant coach at Florida and Kentucky before becoming a head coach.

Following the 2009–10 season, Mitchell was named the SEC Coach of the Year. In addition to Mitchell's recognition, Victoria Dunlap was named the SEC Player of the Year and A'dia Mathies was named the SEC Freshman of the Year. The Wildcats joined the unbeaten national champion 1998 Tennessee squad as the only teams in SEC women's basketball history to sweep the major post-season awards.

Mitchell's success on the court has already moved him up to No. 4 in all-time wins at Kentucky with 86. His winning percentage of 63.7 percent (86–49) ranks third.

Year Three proved to be the best year yet as Mitchell was named SEC Coach of the Year for his remarkable job in turning around a team that went 16–16 overall, 5–9 in conference play the year prior to a 28–8 overall record in 2009–10. The Cats' 28 overall wins, including 11 SEC wins were school records and UK finished second in the league despite being picked to finish 11th in the preseason polls.

In his fourth season Mitchell once again led the Wildcats to an outstanding season with a 25–9 overall record and a school-record-tying 11 wins (11–5) in the SEC. UK took a second-place finish in the league standings for the second-consecutive year and advanced to the second round of the NCAA Tournament as the No. 4 seed.

Mitchell led Kentucky to one of the most successful seasons in school history in 2011–12 with a 28–7 overall record, including an 18–0 mark at home, and an appearance in the Elite Eight for the second time in three years. The Wildcats won their first SEC regular season championship since 1982 with a school-record 13–3 mark in league play. The Cats finished No. 12 in the final AP poll & No. 8 in final USA Today/ESPN coaches' poll, marking the highest final AP ranking since finishing 11th in 1983 and the highest final ranking in the coaches' poll in school history. He was named SEC Coach of the Year for the second time in three seasons by the AP.

In January 2018, Mitchell earned his 300th career victory, with his 270th coming in his twelfth year as Kentucky's head coach.

Head coaching record

Personal

Mitchell attended Mississippi State University from 1993 to 1995, where he received a bachelor of science degree in marketing.

He is married to the former Jenna Ramsey, from Amelia Island, and he has three daughters, Lacy, Saylor and Presley Blue.

Matthew and his wife Jenna are very active in community service. In June 2014, Matthew and Jenna pledged $1 million over the next 10 years to the University of Kentucky Athletics Department. Just a few months later, they launched The Mitchell Family Foundation, a non-profit organization set to benefit charities in the Lexington community. The first fund-raising event of the Foundation in September 2014 brought in renowned author and leadership expert, John C. Maxwell. In October 2016, Matthew and Jenna were presented the 2016 Community Service Award by the National Urban League of Lexington.

RETIREMENT and INJURY

Coach Matthew Mitchell retired after 13 seasons with the Wildcats November 12, 2020 following months of recovery after suffering a concussion from an accident. The accident happened in March 2020 during a family vacation in Mexico. Mitchell fell during a hike, cracked a little part of his skull where blood entered, putting pressure on his brain. After months of suffering headaches, he found out he had bleeding on the brain. He would eventually have brain surgery to correct the problem. Quoted as saying, “Any time you start drilling holes in your skull, it’s a bit of a scary proposition initially," said Mitchell. "The team over at UK HealthCare did an amazing job and surgery was very successful and my family was extremely supportive during my recovery. Very, very blessed and grateful for a wonderful family.”

Announced by University of Kentucky Athletic Director Mitch Barnhart, Barnhart said he and Mitchell spoke on multiple occasions about the challenges the coach continued to experience in coming back from brain surgery. Mitchell called the athletic director and expressed concern he still didn't feel 100 percent and had decided to retire. Barnhart said he asked Mitchell to sleep on his decision, but the coach did not change his mind. The following day, a statement Mitchell released read:

“After much conversation with my family and Mr. Barnhart, I have decided to retire from coaching and effectively have resigned as head coach at Kentucky. This was a difficult decision and I know the timing is not ideal, but I do not feel I can give the job what it requires at this time. As has been much publicized, I have had an eventful offseason with my injury and subsequent surgery. I have been open about the fact that the surgery and recovery process has been life-altering for me and my family. Through that, my priorities towards my family and my faith has grown even larger than before and that has led me to make this decision. Although so much about today is sad because I will greatly miss the relationships and people that have constantly lifted up my family and me the last 13 years, I am resolute in my decision and comfortable with beginning the next chapter of my life. To the current players, thank you for all the support and love you have shown me, not only this year, but in years past. Each one of you has truly left a lasting impact on me and I will cherish our time together. To my former players, assistant coaches and support staff – each one of you has made me a better person and I will always extend a listening ear and encouraging word whenever you need it. I would be remiss if I also did not thank Mr. Barnhart, Lee T. Todd and Eli Capilouto for their commitment and support to women’s basketball at Kentucky and giving me a chance many years ago to be a part of this great university. To Big Blue Nation, 13 years ago you welcomed me and my family with open arms and Jenna and I are forever grateful. Kentucky is our home and this university and community are beautifully unique and special and we are so blessed to have this place in our lives. Finally, I want to thank Kyra Elzy, Niya Butts, Amber Smith, Amy Tilley and everyone in our current support staff for all of their hard work this offseason and preseason as the program navigated uncharted waters. I believe with every ounce of my heart that the greatest place for a young woman to go to college and become a better person ready to face what society has in store is at the University of Kentucky. I am steadfast in that belief because I know the people in this program spend every second of every day focused on how to make other’s lives better. Kyra has done an amazing job leading the program these past few months. She is one of the best coaches in college basketball and has displayed that throughout her career as a top-notch tactician, elite recruiter, and most of all, she is of the highest character. I have the utmost confidence in her to lead Kentucky women’s basketball into future success.”

See also
 Joe Craft Center
 Kentucky Wildcats women's basketball

References

1970 births
Living people
American women's basketball coaches
Basketball coaches from Mississippi
Florida Gators women's basketball coaches
High school basketball coaches in the United States
Kentucky Wildcats women's basketball coaches
Mississippi State University alumni
Morehead State Eagles women's basketball coaches
People from Louisville, Mississippi
Tennessee Lady Volunteers basketball coaches